Caren Metschuck (later Caren Mahn, born 27 September 1963) is a German former swimmer and a multiple Olympic gold medalist. At the 1980 Summer Olympics in Moscow, she won gold medals in the 100 m butterfly, 4×100 m freestyle relay team and 4×100 m medley relay, becoming the most successful female competitor of the Summer Olympic Games that year.

One year later, she won the European Championships in Split in the 100 m freestyle and triumphed again with the 4×100 m freestyle relay and the 4×100 m medley relay team. After winning a world title in the 4×100 m freestyle relay in 1982, she terminated her short career and became a school teacher. During her career she set three world records in relay events. In 1990 she was inducted into the International Swimming Hall of Fame. After German unification she worked as a swimming coach at her home club SC Empor Rostock.

See also
 List of members of the International Swimming Hall of Fame
World record progression 4 × 100 metres freestyle relay
World record progression 4 × 100 metres medley relay

References

External links
 

1963 births
Living people
People from Greifswald
People from Bezirk Rostock
East German female freestyle swimmers
East German female butterfly swimmers
Sportspeople from Mecklenburg-Western Pomerania
Olympic swimmers of East Germany
Olympic gold medalists for East Germany
Swimmers at the 1980 Summer Olympics
World record setters in swimming
Medalists at the 1980 Summer Olympics
World Aquatics Championships medalists in swimming
European Aquatics Championships medalists in swimming
Olympic silver medalists for East Germany
Olympic gold medalists in swimming
Olympic silver medalists in swimming
Recipients of the Patriotic Order of Merit in silver